Henry Hopkins may refer to:

Henry Hopkins (pastor) (1837–1908), American pastor & educator, president of Williams College
Henry Hopkins (curator) (1928–2009), American museum director, art curator and educator
Henry L. Hopkins (1805–1872), Virginia politician
Henry Powell Hopkins (1891–1984), American architect

See also
Henry Hopkins Sibley (1816–1886), American general
Harry Hopkins (disambiguation)